Generation Sap is the debut album from the band Cyclefly, released on 9 August 1999.

Track listing 
All songs written by O'Shea/O'Shea, unless otherwise noted.

"Violet High" - 4:11
"Crawl Down" - 3:02
"Supergod" - 3:15
"Whore" - 5:44
"Following Yesterday" - 2:37
"Better Than You" - 3:37
"Plastic Coated Man" - 3:16
"The Hive" (O'Shea/O'Shea/Presta) - 3:21
"Generation Sap" - 1:59
"Sump" - 4:28
"Slaves" - 4:56

Notes

https://web.archive.org/web/20091024224228/http://geocities.com/darak77/INTERVIEW.html

1999 debut albums
Cyclefly albums
Albums recorded at Sound City Studios